A complete list of songs by the American Pop/R&B singer, Corbin Bleu.

Album Songs
All songs that appear on studio albums released by Corbin Bleu.

A

C

D

F

H

I

M

N

P

R

S

W

Bonus tracks
All songs that are released as bonus tracks on a studio album released by Corbin Bleu.

Soundtrack Releases
All songs in which Corbin Bleu have recorded for film on soundtrack releases.

Released Covers

See also
 Corbin Bleu
 Corbin Bleu discography

External links
Corbin Bleu Official Website

Bleu, Corbin